

Legislative Assembly elections
Bihar amidst states of India had elections for their legislative assemblies in 2010.

The tenure of the Legislative Assembly of Bihar expired on 26 November. The Election Commission of India (ECI) decided on the dates of the polls.

Bihar 

The Janata Dal (United) was the largest party in the assembly after the 2005 election, and co-ruled with the Bharatiya Janata Party as part of the National Democratic Alliance. The incumbent chief minister was Nitish Kumar.

See also
S. Y. Quraishi

References

External links

 Election Commission of India

2010 elections in India
India
2010 in India
Elections in India by year